Baby Cow Productions Ltd is a British comedy television production company based in London and Manchester, founded by Steve Coogan and Henry Normal.  Since its establishment it has diversified into radio, animation and film. According to their website, Baby Cow  "produces bold, high-quality scripted entertainment across all genres for television, film and radio." The company's name is a reference to Coogan's early characters Paul and Pauline Calf.

General information 
Baby Cow Productions is a publicly held company which employs between 11 and 50 employees at any one time.

History 
The company was founded in 1999 by Steve Coogan and Henry Normal, with Coogan assuming the role of Creative Director and Normal assuming the role of CEO.

In 2008, BBC Worldwide bought a 25% stake in the company. The acquisition was made at a time when BBC Worldwide was being criticised for its "out of control" ventures, though Normal told The Guardian that BBC Worldwide had not made the highest bid.

In April 2016, Henry Normal stood down as CEO and left the full time position. He remained a consultant of the company for the following year and supported the company while they looked to replace him.  Coogan then assumed a broader role as part of his transition.

Upon his departure, Normal commented that “After sixteen and a half years I've decided to take a long overdue break from TV and film production to pursue creative endeavours in other fields. I'm very proud to have been part of a company that has nurtured young talent, sought out originality and produced quality award-winning shows year after year. Steve has such a great team around him and with further support from BBC Worldwide, I know Baby Cow will achieve even greater success in the years to come.” Coogan then went on to add that “Henry has devoted himself brilliantly to the company over the years and deserves to pursue more personal projects. I salute him. He leaves behind a passionate team with great taste and the company he co-founded is in a strong place to grow."

Normal was eventually replaced with Christine Langan, who was the current CEO until November 2020. She left her role as head of BBC Films for the job. BBC Worldwide then increased their stake in the company to 73% after Normal's departure. Langan has taken an executive producer role on every Baby Cow productions since she took the job including Camping, The Killing Machine, This Time with Alan Partridge and a new show entitled The Witchfinder, starring Tim Key and Daisy May Cooper, which premiered in the spring of 2022.

Significant Awards

RTS Craft Awards 2018 
Costume Design – Entertainment & Non Drama – Howard Burden for Zapped (Series 2) Baby Cow Productions / Black Dog Productions / Itchy Coo Productions for Dave

BAFTAS 2017 
Won Best Male Comedy Performance – Steve Coogan for Alan Partridge's Scissored Isle
Nominated Best Comedy Writer – Steve Coogan, Neil Gibbons and Rob Gibbons for Alan Partridge's Scissored Isle.

International Emmy Awards 2017 
Won Best Comedy – Alan Partridge's Scissored Isle.

Writers’ Guild of Great Britain Awards 2014 
Nominated: Best Situation Comedy – Up The Women (Jessica Hynes)
Nominated: Screenplay – Philomena (Jeff Pope & Steve Coogan).

Golden Globe Awards 2014 
Nominated: Best Performance by an Actress in a motion picture – Judi Dench – Philomena
Nominated: Best Screenplay – Steve Coogan & Jeff Pope – Philomena
Nominated: Best Drama Motion Picture – Philomena.

Productions

News
LIVING News (2006–2009) and (2010–2012) for LIVING 5 x 29 mins

Television
 Chivalry (2022) for Channel 4
 The Witchfinder (2022) for BBC TWO
Red Dwarf XII (2017) for Dave 6 × 30 minutes
Red Dwarf XI (2016) for Dave 6 × 30 minutes
Wussywat the Clumsy Cat (2014) for CBeebies 52 × 5 mins
High & Dry (2014) for Channel 4 Online
British Muslim Comedy (2014) Channel 4 Online
Undercover (2014) for Dave 6 × 30mins
Moone Boy series 3 (2014)
UNCLE series 2 (2014) for BBC THREE
Sensitive Skin (2014) for Movie Central/The Movie Network, 6 × 30 mins episodes
Up The Women series 2 (2015) for BBC 2
Timeless (2014) for SKY 1 HD
The Trip to Italy (2014) for BBC2 6 × 30mins
Moone Boy series 2 (2014) for SKY1 HD 6 × 30 mins
Over To Bill (2014) for BBC 1
Behind The Moone (2014) for SKY 1 HD 1 × 30mins
UNCLE series1 (2014) BBC THREE & BBC1
Liam Williams Blaps (2014) Channel4 Online
Warren United (2014) for ITV4 6 × 22mins
Hebburn Christmas Special (2013) BBC TWO
Hebburn Series 2 (2013) BBC2 6 × 30 mins
Starlings Series 2 (2013) for SKY1 HD 8 × 60mins
Up The Women (2013) BBC FOUR 3 × 30mins
Gifted (2013) for Sky Arts 1 × 30mins
Common Ground (2013) for Sky Atlantic HD, 10 × 10mins
Tommy Tiernan's Little Cracker (2012) for Sky1 HD
Uncle Pilot (2012) for BBC THREE 1 × 30mins
Uncle Wormsley's Christmas (2012) for Sky Atlantic HD, 1 × 30mins
The Cow That Almost Missed Christmas (2012) for BBC1, BBC2 and CBEEBIES. 1 × 30mins
Hunderby (2012) for Sky Atlantic. 8 × 30 mins episodes
Moone Boy (2012) for Sky 1. 6 × 30 mins episodes
Hebburn (2012) for BBC2. 6 × 30 mins episodes
Starlings (2012) for Sky 1. 8 × 60 mins episodes
Steve Coogan Live n Lewd (2012) for Channel 4. 1 × 60 mins episode
Alan Partridge: Welcome to the Places of My Life (2012) for Sky Atlantic. 1 × 60 mins episode
Steve Coogan: Stand-Up Down Under (2012) for Sky Atlantic. 2 × 60 mins episodes
Mid Morning Matters with Alan Partridge: Special Edition (2012) for Sky Atlantic. 6 × 30 mins episodes
Alan Partridge on Open Books With Martin Bryce (2012) for Sky Atlantic. 1 × 60 mins episode
Nick Helm: Solid Gold Super Hits (2012) for Channel 4 online. 3 × 4 mins episode
Uncle Wormsleys Christmas (2012) for Sky Atlantic. 1 × 30 mins episode.
Johnny Vegas' Little Cracker (2012) for Sky 1. 1 × 11 mins episode
John Bishop's Little Cracker (2012) for Sky 1. 1 × 11 mins episode
Totally Tom (2011) for E4. 1 × 30 mins episode
The Man Who Thinks It (2011) for Channel 4
The Shadow Line (2011) for BBC2. 7 × 60 mins episodes
Alan Partridge and other less successful characters (2010) for Channel 4
Doing Chekhov (2010) for Sky Arts
101 Really Bad Ideas (2010) for BBC Comedy Online. 6 × 1 mins episodes
Chekhov (2010) for Sky Arts. 4 × 60 mins episodes
Mid Morning Matters for Online (2010) for Fosters Funny Online. 12 × 11 mins episodes
The Trip (2010) for BBC2. 6 × 30 mins episodes
Stand Up Hero 2010 (2010) for ITV4. 6 × 60 mins episodes
Ideal Outtakes (2010) for BBC3.
World Cup Diary (2010) for ITV4. 1 × 20 mins episode
Lizzie and Sarah (2010) for BBC2. 1 × 30 mins episode
FHM Stand Up Hero 2009 (2010) for ITV4. 1 × 60 mins episode
Gavin and Stacey the Outtakes (2010) for BBC3. 1 × 30 mins episode
Politicians Outtakes (2009) for BBC3. 1 × 30 mins episode. (plus 1 × 5 mins, 1 × 10 mins, 1 × 15 mins, 1 × 20 mins)
Steve Coogan: The Inside Story (2009) for BBC2. 1 × 30 mins episode
The All Star Impressions Show (2009) for ITV1. 1 × 30 mins episode
Outtakes: US presidents (2009) for BBC3. 1 × 30 mins episode
Home Time (2009) for BBC2. 6 × 30 mins episodes
Brave Young Men (2009) for BBC3. 1 × 30 mins episode
Gavin and Stacey 12 Days of Christmas (2008) for BBC3. 1 × 45 mins episode
Gavin and Stacey Christmas Special (2008) for BBC1. 1 × 60 mins episode
Ketch! And HIRO-PON (2008) for BBC3. 1 × 30 mins episode
The Last Word Monologues (2008) for BBC3. 3 × 30 mins episodes
Dolly and Laura (2008) for E4. 1 × 15 mins episode
 The Mighty Boosh. A Journey Through Time and Space (2008) for BBC3. 1 × 60 mins episode
Karl Pilkington : Satisfied Fool (2007) for Channel 4. 1 × 30 mins episode
The Scariest Night on TV (2007) for Sci Fi.
Where are the Joneses? (2007) for online. 60 × 5 mins episodes
Gavin & Stacey (three series) (2007–2010) for BBC1, BBC2 and BBC3. 20 × 30 mins episodes
Classic Coogan (2007) for UKTV G2. 8 comedy shorts
Stuck (2007) for BBC4
The Former Ambassador (2007) for Paramount Comedy Channel. 10 × 1 mins episodes
The Abbey (2007) for ITV1. 1 × 30 mins episode
Rob Rouse and his Duck (2006) for Paramount Comedy Channel. 10 × 1 mins episodes
Saxondale (two series) (2006–2007) for BBC2. 14 × 30 mins episodes
Outtakes World Leaders (2006) for BBC3. 1 × 30 mins episode
Ideal Xmas Special (2005) for BBC3. 1 × 30 mins episode
Sensitive Skin (two series) (2005–07) for BBC2. 12 × 30 mins episodes
Monkey Trousers for ITV1. 6 × 30 mins episodes
Glen Wool What's The Story (2005) for Channel 4 (Comedy Lab). 1 × 30 mins episode
MPs Outtakes (2005) for BBC3. 1 × 30 mins episode
Kelsey Gramma Presents The Sketch Show (2005) for Fox. 6 × 30 mins episodes
Ideal (seven series) (2005–2011) for BBC3. 52 × 30 mins episodes
The Keith Barret Show (two series) (2004–2005) for BBC2. 12 × 30 mins episodes
The Big Impression 2004 Christmas Special (2004) for BBC1. 1 × 30 mins episode
AD/BC: A Rock Opera (2004) for BBC3. 1 × 30 mins episode.
The Keith Barret Christmas Special (2004) for BBC2. 1 × 30 mins episode
Hurrah for Cancer (2004) for BBC3. 1 × 30 mins episode
Slam Poets (2004) for BBC3. 1 × 60 mins episode
Sven and Nancy's Big Impression (2004) for BBC1. 1 × 30 mins episode
The Mighty Boosh (three series) (2004–2008) for BBC2 and BBC3. 20 × 30 mins episodes
I Am Not an Animal (2004) for BBC2. 6 × 30 mins episodes
All Star Comedy Show (2004) for ITV1. 2 × 30 mins episodes
From Bard to Verse (2004) for BBC3. 8 × 15 mins episodes
Sweet and Sour (2004) for BBC3. 1 × 30 mins episodes
Nighty Night (two series) (2004–2005) for BBC2 and BBC3. 12 × 30 mins episodes
Posh and Beck's Big Impression (2003) for BBC1. 1 × 30 mins episodePosh and Beck's Big Impression Behind The Scenes and Extra Bits (2003) for BBC3. 1 × 28 mins episodeThe Private Life of Samuel Pepys (2003) for BBC2. 1 × 60 mins episodeWhine Gums (2003) for BBC3. 8 × 15 mins episodesBrain Candy (2003) for BBC3. 14 × 15 mins episodePaul and Pauline Calf's Cheese and Ham Sandwich (2003) for BBC2 and BBC3. 1 × 28 mins episodeMarion and Geoff series 2 (2003) for BBC2. 6 × 30 mins episodeThe Boosh Pilot (2003) for BBC3. 1 × 30 mins episodeCruise of the Gods (2002) for BBC2. 1 × 90 mins episodeUp in Town (2002) for BBC2. 6 × 10 mins, 2 × 30 mins episodesThe Sketch Show (two series) (2001–2002) for ITV1. 16 × 30 mins episodesCombat Sheep (2001) for BBC2. 1 × 30 mins episodeDr Terrible's House of Horrible (2001) for BBC2. 6 × 30 mins episodesA Small Summer Party (2001) for BBC2. 1 × 50 mins episodeMarion & Geoff (2000) BBC2 6 × 30 mins episodesHuman Remains (2000) for BBC2 and BBC3. 6 × 30 mins episodes

FilmIdeal Home (2018)Mindhorn (2016)I Believe in Miracles (2015) FeatureSOS (2014) featureThe Trip To Italy (2014) FeatureNorthern Soul (2013) FeaturePhilomena (2013) FeatureAlan Partridge: Alpha Papa (2013) FeatureThe Look of Love (2013) FeatureSvengali (2013) FeatureGus and his Dirty Dead Dad (2013)Marvin (2011) Animated ShortThe Trip (2010) FeatureDown Terrace (2009) FeatureSnow Cake (2006) FeatureThe 10th Man (2006) ShortA Cock and Bull Story (2005) FeatureDating Ray Fenwick (2005) Short24 Hour Party People (2002) Feature
Ali G Indahouse (2002) Feature The Parole Officer (2001) Feature

AnimationI Am Not an Animal (2004) for BBC2. 6 x 30 min episodes.The Cow That Almost Missed Christmas (2012) for CBeebies. 1 x 30 mins episode.Uncle Wormsley's Christmas (2012) for Sky Atlantic. 1 x 30 min episodes.Warren United (2013) for ITV4. 6 x 30 min episodes.Wussywat The Clumsy Cat for CBeebies. 52 × 5 mins episodes.

RadioNebulous'' (three series) (2005–2008) for BBC Radio 4. 18 x 30 mins episodes

References

External links 

Television production companies of the United Kingdom
Mass media companies established in 1999
British companies established in 1999